Katana Maidens: Toji No Miko is an anime television series, which is co-produced between Genco and Studio Gokumi. Kodai Kakimoto directed the series, while Tatsuya Takahashi is in charge of scripts and Yoshinori Shizuma is the character designer. Kaede Hondo, Saori Ōnishi, Azumi Waki, Hina Kino, Risae Matsuda and Eri Suzuki performed both the first opening theme "Save Me Save You" and the first ending theme . They also performed the second opening theme  and the second ending theme . The series aired from January 5 to June 22, 2018. It ran for 24 episodes. Crunchyroll streamed the series, while Funimation produced an English dub.

A new anime television series titled Mini Toji aired from January 5 to March 16, 2019 on AT-X, Tokyo MX, BS11, and MBS. The series is animated by Project No.9 and directed by Yuu Nobuta, with Aoi Akashiro handling the series' scripts, and Hiromi Ogata designing the characters. The series ran for 11 episodes. Crunchyroll streamed the series.


Watch mini after the first then the last

Katana Maidens ~ Toji No Miko

Mini Toji

Home release

Japanese
In Japan, Media Factory released the series in 6 volumes from April 25, 2018 to September 26, 2018.

English

Notes

References

Katana Maidens: Toji No Miko